The I Inside is a 2003 psychological thriller directed by Roland Suso Richter. It was written by Michael Cooney based on his own play Point of Death. This film has no connection with the science-fiction novel The I Inside, by Alan Dean Foster.

Plot
Simon Cable wakes up in a hospital bed, confused and disoriented. He soon discovers from doctors that he has amnesia and is unable to remember the last two years of his life. Cable investigates what has happened to him and slowly pieces together his enigmatic past.

Cast
 Ryan Phillippe as Simon Cable
 Sarah Polley as Clair
 Piper Perabo as Anna
 Stephen Rea as Dr. Newman
 Robert Sean Leonard as Peter Cable
 Stephen Lang as Mr. Travitt
 Peter Egan as Dr. Truman 
 Stephen Graham as Travis 
 Rakie Ayola as Nurse Clayton

Production
The film is the English-language debut of German director Roland Suso Richter, whose previous credits include The Tunnel, After the Truth, and 14 Days to Life. Richter commented on the script by saying, "I was excited when I first read the script and if I can give something like that to the audience, that would be great." The film was initially announced in 2001 with Stephen Dorff, Jennifer Love Hewitt and Christian Slater in talks to star. Production began on June 5, 2002 in Wales on a budget of about $10 million, and wrapped in mid-July 2002. For the backdrop, the production crew used Sully Hospital, near Penarth, Cardiff in south Wales. Ryan Phillippe commented on filming in Wales, which was his first trip to the country, "The people are great and I have found some world-class restaurants, which is nice when you are get off from filming and want to go somewhere to relax."

Analyzing the criminal psyche is a common motif in Cooney's films and plays, and The I Inside is no exception. Though he himself is a stranger to real-life criminal trauma, Cooney explains that, "It's true that (criminal) psychology is a recurring theme of all my plays — those that aren't comedies, anyway. And while I don't have any background in it, I maintain that it's because I had such a happy childhood. It allowed me to explore the darker side of things, because I knew I would never get lost there."

Reception
The film has generally received negative reviews from online critics. It holds a 33% rating on Rotten Tomatoes. Review sites have commended the film for a rather involving first two-thirds, with the mystery slowly being revealed layer by layer, drawing in the viewer. However, some critics found the ending a let down, calling it a "gotcha" gimmick that causes "the past 70 or so minutes (to go) out the window". Currentfilm.com gives the most positive review of the film, bestowing a rating of 3 out of 4 stars and describing the film as "an absolutely terrific thriller, and a really great surprise". The review acknowledges that there are "some minor story flaws and plot holes" but adds "that's not totally unexpected in a totally twisty film like this". Christopher Null of Filmcritic.com brings up a strange but interesting point: "The movie is based on a play with a much different title, one that actually gives away the surprise ending."

The I Inside has been compared with such films as Memento, The Butterfly Effect, eXistenZ, and Jacob's Ladder in several critical reviews. These films all feature similar story elements that tend to blur the distinctions between fantasy and reality.

References

Further reading

External links

 
 

American thriller films
2003 films
2000s psychological thriller films
2000s supernatural thriller films
British films based on plays
British thriller films
American films based on plays
Films about amnesia
Films scored by Nicholas Pike
2000s English-language films
2000s American films
2000s British films
Films about disability